Martin Bjørnbak (born 22 March 1992) is a Norwegian professional footballer who plays as a defender for Eliteserien club Molde.

Club career
Born in Mo i Rana, Bjørnbak started his career at local club Stålkameratene before he joined Bodø/Glimt ahead of the 2011 season. In his first season with Bodø/Glimt, Bjørnbak played 23 matches and scored one goal in the 1. divisjon, before transferring to Haugesund where he signed a four-year contract. Bjørnbak made his debut in the Tippeligaen in the match against Vålerenga on 25 March 2012, but was sent off after 33 minutes when he fouled Marcus Pedersen as the last man. Bjørnbak played a total of 17 matches for Haugesund in his first season.

On 17 January 2019, Bjørnbak signed a four-year contract with Molde. He got his Molde debut on 31 March 2019 in a 1–1 away draw against Sarpsborg 08.

International career
Bjørnbak first appeared for Norway at international level when he played three matches for the under-17 team in 2009. In 2012, Bjørnbak again represented his country when he played ten matches for the under-21 team.

Career statistics

Club

Honours

Club
Molde
Eliteserien: 2019, 2022
Norwegian Cup: 2021–22

References

External links
 

1992 births
Living people
People from Rana, Norway
Norwegian footballers
Association football defenders
Eliteserien players
Norwegian First Division players
FK Bodø/Glimt players
FK Haugesund players
Molde FK players
Sportspeople from Nordland